Evan Elken (born February 19, 1977) is a former American cyclist.

Palmares
2008
1st stage 4b Tour de Beauce

References

External links
 
 
 

1977 births
Living people
American male cyclists